Cosmoplatidius is a genus of beetles in the family Cerambycidae, containing the following species:

 Cosmoplatidius abare Napp & Martins, 2006
 Cosmoplatidius lycoides (Guérin-Méneville, 1844)
 Cosmoplatidius sellatus (White, 1853)
 Cosmoplatidius simulans (Bates, 1870)

References

Compsocerini